was a Japanese actress from Tokyo. Widely popular in Japan, she gained worldwide recognition for her portrayal of Tripitaka in the TV series Monkey, which is now considered a cult classic.

Biography 
Masako was born Masako Odate in Shibuya, Tokyo, the only daughter of Sue and Kazu Odate. Raised in Naka-ku, Yokohama, while in junior college in 1976 she auditioned for the lead role in Nihon TV's drama Ai ga miemasu ka ("Can you see love?"). Chosen from 4,000 applicants, she dropped out of school to pursue an acting career, playing the part under her real name Masako Odate. Masako's mother initially objected to her choice of career and requested that she not use the Odate family name if she gained further work. In 1977, she changed her name to Natsume.

In 1977, she was chosen to represent Kanebo Cosmetics, achieving great popularity after appearing topless as the "Kooky Face" girl in an ad for sunscreen. This popularity led to her recording a song later that year called "Oh! Cookie Face." Many bit parts and a few leads in movies followed, but she continued in television.

In 1978-79, she played the male part of Tripitaka (Sanzō-hōshi, Japanese translation of Sanzang-fashi) in the 1970s Japanese TV program Saiyūki, which proved popular in many English-speaking countries in the 1980s, when dubbed by the BBC and titled Monkey. Masako won the part as she had matched contemporary descriptions of Sanzō-hōshi's appearance more closely than male actors who auditioned.

Specialising as well-bred but shy heroines in her movies, she was regularly criticized by the public and media for her poor acting. However, this changed in 1982 after appearing as an ambitious and immoral woman in the TV drama Shousha and as the daughter of a Yakuza leader in the movie Onimasa. One of her lines from this movie, became a very popular catchphrase in Japan.

She won the award for best actress at the 8th Hochi Film Award for The Catch and Time and Tide.

Death
In 1984, she married Japanese author Tadaki Nishiyama, known under the pen name Shizuka Ijūin. But after only a year, she died from acute leukemia at the age of 27 in 1985, and is buried in Hōfu, Yamaguchi under the married name Masako Nishiyama.

Legacy
In 1997, Canon produced a television commercial for a copy machine, featuring her photocopied images, which offered 100 free compilations of the images in a book. Canon received 230,000 applications. Masako Natsume picture books and calendars are still popular in Japan today.

In 2007, TBS broadcast a documentary on Masako's life entitled Himawari – Natsume Masako 27-nen no shōgai to haha no ai ("Sunflower: Masako Natsume, a 27-year life and a mother's love") based on the book Futari no Masako written by her mother, Sue Odate. Yagi Yūki played the part of the young Masako and Nakama Yukie portrayed her as an adult.

Filmography

Films

Television

Awards

Notes 
Both of Masako's brothers, Kazuo and Toshiaki Odate are professional golfers. Toshiaki won the 1993 Woodone Open and the 2001 JCB Classic. Masako's sister-in-law, Yoshiko Odate, an actress and former member of the popular 1970s pop group Candies died on April 21, 2011 of breast cancer. Her niece is an actress in the all-female theater company Takarazuka Revue under the stage name Yuno Kazama.

Mawaru-Penguindrum, a 2011 Japanese anime series produced by Brain's Base has a character named Masako Natsume.

References

External links 
Biography of Natsume
Burial monument 
The Sunflower Foundation, a cancer organization dedicated to Natsume 

1957 births
1985 deaths
Actresses from Tokyo
Japanese idols
Deaths from leukemia
Deaths from cancer in Japan
20th-century Japanese actresses